Spinel is the magnesium/aluminium member of the larger spinel group of minerals. It has the formula  in the cubic crystal system. Its name comes from the Latin word , which means spine in reference to its pointed crystals.

Properties

Spinel crystallizes in the isometric system; common crystal forms are octahedra, usually twinned. It has no true cleavage, but shows an octahedral parting and a conchoidal fracture. Its hardness is 8, its specific gravity is 3.5–4.1, and it is transparent to opaque with a vitreous to dull luster. It may be colorless, but is usually various shades of red, lavender, blue, green, brown, black, or yellow. Chromium(3+) causes the red color in spinel from Burma. Some spinels are among the most famous gemstones; among them are the Black Prince's Ruby and the "Timur ruby" in the British Crown Jewels, and the "Côte de Bretagne", formerly from the French Crown jewels. The Samarian Spinel is the largest known spinel in the world, weighing .

The transparent red spinels were called spinel-rubies or balas rubies. In the past, before the arrival of modern science, spinels and rubies were equally known as rubies. After the 18th century, the word ruby was only used for the red gem variety of the mineral corundum, and the word spinel came to be used. "Balas" is derived from Balascia, the ancient name for Badakhshan, a region in central Asia situated in the upper valley of the Panj River, one of the principal tributaries of the Oxus River. However, "Balascia" itself may be derived from Sanskrit bālasūryaka, which translates as "crimson-coloured morning sun". Mines in the Gorno Badakhshan region of Tajikistan constituted for centuries the main source for red and pink spinels.

Occurrence

Geologic occurrence
Spinel is found as a metamorphic mineral in metamorphosed limestones and silica-poor mudstones. It also occurs as a primary mineral in rare mafic igneous rocks; in these igneous rocks, the magmas are relatively deficient in alkalis relative to aluminium, and aluminium oxide may form as the mineral corundum or may combine with magnesia to form spinel. This is why spinel and ruby are often found together. The spinel petrogenesis in mafic magmatic rocks is strongly debated, but certainly results from mafic magma interaction with more evolved magma  or rock (e.g. gabbro, troctolite).

Spinel, is common in peridotite in the uppermost Earth's mantle, between approximately 20 km to approximately 120 km, possibly to lower depths depending on the chromium content.  At significantly shallower depths, above the Moho, calcic plagioclase is the more stable aluminous mineral in peridotite while garnet is the stable phase deeper in the mantle below the spinel stability region.

Spinel, is a common mineral in the Ca-Al-rich inclusions (CAIs) in some chondritic meteorites.

Geographical occurrence
Spinel has long been found in the gemstone-bearing gravel of Sri Lanka and in limestones of the Badakshan Province in modern-day Afghanistan and Tajikistan; and of Mogok in Myanmar. Over the last decades gem quality spinels are found in the marbles of Lục Yên District (Vietnam), Mahenge and Matombo (Tanzania), Tsavo (Kenya) and in the gravels of Tunduru (Tanzania) and Ilakaka (Madagascar).

Since 2000, in several locations around the world, spinels have been discovered with unusual vivid pink or blue colors. Such "glowing" spinels are known from Mogok (Myanmar), Mahenge plateau (Tanzania), Lục Yên District (Vietnam) and some more localities. In 2018 bright blue spinels have been reported also in the southern part of Baffin Island (Canada). The pure blue coloration of spinel is caused by small additions of cobalt.

Synthetic spinel
Synthetic spinel can be produced by similar means to synthetic corundum, including the Verneuil method and the flux method pioneered by Edmond Frémy. It is widely used as an inexpensive cut gem in birthstone jewelry for the month of August. Light blue synthetic spinel is a good imitation of aquamarine beryl, and green synthetic spinel is used as an emerald or tourmaline simulant. By 2015, transparent spinel was being made in sheets and other shapes through sintering. Synthetic spinel, which looks like glass but has notably higher strength against pressure, can also have applications in military and commercial use.

See also
 
 Aluminium oxynitride
 Ceylonite
 The Three Brothers, a lost 14th-century crown jewel with three red spinels in a triangular arrangement

References

Bibliography
 Deer, Howie and Zussman (1966). An Introduction to the Rock-Forming Minerals, Longman, pp. 424–433, .
 Shumann, Walter (2006). Gemstones of the World 3rd edition, Sterling, pp. 116–117.

External links

 Spinel structure at the University of Wisconsin - Green Bay
 Spinel structure at the Institut for materials science of the University of Kiel
 Value of Spinel

 
Aluminium minerals
Cubic minerals
Minerals in space group 227
Magnesium minerals
Luminescent minerals
Transparent materials